Robert William d'Escourt Ashe (23 November 1872 – 17 June 1911) was the acting Collector and District magistrate of Tirunelveli district in Madras Presidency during the British Raj. Ashe had played a significant part in bringing about the closure of the Swadeshi Steam Navigation Company, started by V.O. Chidambaram Pillai to take on the British India Steam Navigation Company that had for long monopolised trade in the southern part of the Bay of Bengal. He had also been responsible for charging V.O.Chidambaram Pillai and a colleague, Subramanya Siva, for which they were convicted. On 17 June 1911 Ashe was assassinated by Vanchinathan at the Maniyachi railway junction, between Tirunelveli and Tuticorin. After the shooting, Vanchinathan ran along the platform and took cover in the latrine. Some time later he was found dead, having shot himself in the mouth. Vanchi was accompanied by a youth named Sankara Krishna Aiyar who ran away, but was afterwards caught and convicted. Ashe was the first and only colonial official to be assassinated in South India during the Indian independence movement. The British government built a memorial for him at Tuticorin in 1913. That memorial is currently in dilapidated condition.

It is also because Ashe took action to ensure all people could bathe at the Courtallam waterfalls, which till then was exclusively reserved for the upper caste Indians and for bathing of idols of deities. This action opened up the waterfalls for the dalit people. Also he allowed to carry a lower caste women in the streets of Agrahara, place where upper caste lives, when she was sick and severely opposed caste discrimination in south districts of Madras presidency. This agitated the upper caste men and due to this Vanchinathan shot at Ashe. In recent times, dalit organisations have been paying homage to Ashe on his birthday, by offering floral tributes to his memorial and his grave which is located at the English Church, opposite the St. John's College, Palamcottah.

Personal life 
Ashe was a Protestant from Ireland. He had two sons and two daughters. One of his sons was killed in the Second World War while the other joined the Indian Army and served until 1947. His daughters died childless.

References 

Indian Civil Service (British India) officers
Assassinated British people
1872 births
1911 deaths